Elias RIchard Lorenzo, OSB (born October 6, 1960) is an American prelate of the Catholic Church who has served as an auxiliary bishop for the Archdiocese of Newark in New Jersey since 2020. 

Lorenzo was previously the abbot president of the American-Cassinese Congregation of Benedictine monasteries. Lorenzo was the third member of St. Mary's Abbey in Morris Township to hold this position and the first to become a bishop.

Biography

Early life 
Elias Lorenzo was born on October 6, 1960, in Brooklyn, New York. He attended St. Agatha Parish Elementary School in Sunset Park, Brooklyn and Cathedral Preparatory School and Seminary in Fort Greene, Brooklyn. He received a Bachelor of Philosophy degree from Don Bosco College in Newton, New Jersey. Lorenzo entered St Mary's Abbey, a Benedictine monastery of the American-Cassinese Congregation in Morris Township, New Jersey, in 1983.

Priesthood 
Lorenzo was ordained a priest of the Benedictine Order by Bishop Frank Rodimer on June 24, 1989. Lorenzo has served in several positions at Delbarton School in Morristown, New Jersey:

 Secondary teacher and administrator 
 Director of campus ministry
 Member of board of trustees
 Chairman of the Religious Studies department
 Vice president 

Lorenzo has also served on the advisory board of Operation Smile International, having participated in medical missions to Bolivia, China, Honduras, India, Kenya, Nicaragua, and the Philippines.

At St. Mary's Abbey, Lorenzo served as director of liturgy, prior of the abbey and rector of the church. During this same time, he served as a member and chairman of the Paterson Diocesan Liturgical Commission for 12 years. Following his service as prior, Lorenzo was appointed vicar for religious in the Diocese of Metuchen. Thereafter, he worked as canonical counsel for Praesidium, Inc. in the development of national safe environment standards and protocols. He currently serves on Praesidium's advisory board.

Lorenzo served as prior of the Primatial Abbey of Saint Anselmo in Rome from 2009 to 2016. In addition, he worked as procurator general for the Benedictine Order in Rome. Lorenzo is a founding member of the International Commission for Benedictine Education and served as its president. In this role, he has visited Benedictine schools throughout the United States, Western Europe, South America, Latin America, Africa, Australia, and the Philippines.

In 2016, Lorenzo was elected abbot president of the American Cassinese Congregation, an association of Benedictine monasteries in the United States. As abbot president, Lorenzo was a member of the Union of Superiors General, which met bi-annually in Rome, and the Conference of Major Superiors of Men, which met bi-annually in various regions of the country and at a national assembly each year.

Lorenzo holds a Master of Liturgical Theology degree from St. John's University in Collegeville, Minnesota, an Master of Education degree in counseling psychology from Seton Hall University in South Orange, New Jersey, and a Licentiate in Canon Law from the Catholic University of America in Washington, D,C.

Auxiliary Bishop of Newark 
On February 27, 2020, Lorenzo was appointed as an auxiliary bishop of the Archdiocese of Newark by Pope Francis Lorenzo's consecration, scheduled for May 5, 2020, but postponed due to the COVID-19 pandemic, occurred on June 30, 2020. The principal consecrator was Cardinal Joseph W. Tobin. The co-consecrators were Auxiliary Bishops John Flesey and Manuel Cruz. , Lorenzo serves as regional bishop for Union County in the archdiocese.

See also

 Catholic Church hierarchy
 Catholic Church in the United States
 Historical list of the Catholic bishops of the United States
 List of Catholic bishops of the United States
 Lists of patriarchs, archbishops, and bishops

References

External links
 Roman Catholic Archdiocese of Newark Official Site

1960 births
Living people
American Benedictines
21st-century Roman Catholic bishops in the United States
Catholic University of America alumni
College of Saint Benedict and Saint John's University alumni
People from Brooklyn
Seton Hall University alumni
Bishops appointed by Pope Francis
Benedictine bishops